St Nidan's Church may refer to:

 St Nidan's Church, Llanidan, built in the mid-19th century
 Old Church of St Nidan, Llanidan, its medieval predecessor